Keith Taylor (born 1952) is a Canadian poet, translator and professor.

Life and work 
  
Born in British Columbia, Taylor spent his childhood in Alberta and Indiana.  After earning an M.A. in English from Central Michigan University, he worked a variety of odd jobs:  the co-host of a radio talk show, a house painter, a freight handler, a teacher, a freelance writer. He also worked at Shaman Drum, a leading independent bookstore, for twenty years. He currently lives in Ann Arbor with his wife and daughter and is a professor in the creative writing program at University of Michigan.

His poems have appeared in many journals, including The Ann Arbor Observer, The Chicago Tribune, The Detroit Free Press, The Los Angeles Times, Michigan Quarterly Review, The Notre Dame Review, ' Poetry Ireland Review, and The Sunday Telegraph Magazine (London). Taylor is the recipient of, among other awards, a fellowship in poetry from the National Endowment for the Arts.

Books

Collections
Learning to Dance (Falling Water Books, 1985)
Weather Report (Ridgeway Press, 1988) 
Dream of the Black Wolf: Notes from Isle Royale (Ridgeway Press, 1993) 
Detail from the Garden of Delights (Limited Mailing Press, 1993) 
Everything I Need (March Street Press, 1996) 
Life Science and Other Stories (Hanging Loose Press, 1995)
Guilty at the Rapture (Hanging Loose Press, 2006) 
If the World Becomes so Bright (Wayne State University Press, 2009)
Marginalia for a Natural History (Black Lawrence Press, 2011)
The Ancient Murrelet (Alice Greene & Co., 2013)
Fidelities (Alice Greene & Co., 2015)
The Bird-while (Wayne State University Press, 2017)

Anthologies as editor
The Huron River: Voices from the Watershed ed. Keith Taylor and John Knott (The University of Michigan Press, 2000)
What These Ithakas Mean: Readings in Cavafy ed. Artemis Leontis, Lauren Talalay, and Keith Taylor (Athens, Greece: E.L.I.A., 2002)
Ghost Writers: Us Haunting Them ed. Keith Taylor and Laura Kasischke (Wayne State University Press, 2011)

Translations
Battered Guitars: The Poetry and Prose of Kostas Karyotakis (University of Birmingham, 2006)

References

Sources 
http://www.keithtaylorannarbor.com/biography.html
http://www.keithtaylorannarbor.com/publications.html

1951 births
20th-century Canadian poets
Canadian male poets
University of Michigan faculty
Living people
20th-century Canadian male writers